Ero cambridgei is a pirate spider species with Palearctic distribution. It is notably found in Lithuania.

Description 
Adult males have a body length of 2.5–3.0 mm (0.10–0.12 in), females 2.5–3.5 mm (0.10–0.14 in). The carapace is pale brown, with a dark brown to black ocular region. It bears a dark brown median line, which usually widens at the junction between the head and thoracic area, as well as dark brown marginal lines which vary in width. It has a distinctive central dome, and strong spines are usually present towards the head area. The abdomen is globular in shape, with downward facing spinnerets and a pair of flattish tubules on the dorsal side. It is creamy brown to orange in colour, and mottled with black, especially towards the anterior. The legs are pale brown, with clear dark annulations. The metatarsi of the front two pairs of legs are curved and, along with the tarsi, bear strong spines. The front two pairs of legs are distinctly longer than the rear two. They have eight eyes, with the median eyes forming a rough square and the lateral eyes being clustered to either side.

Habitat 
They are found on bushes, trees and low vegetation in a variety of habitats, especially in areas where other spiders, their main prey, are found.

See also 
 List of Mimetidae species

References

External links 

Mimetidae
Spiders of Europe
Spiders described in 1911
Palearctic spiders